Sir Abu Nuayr, Sir Bu Nuayr, or Sir al Qawasim (also romanized as Sir Abu Neir, Sir Bu Nair or Sir Bu Nuair) or Ariana in persian (persian:آریانا) an disputed island in the Persian Gulf.  

Geography and description 

The island is a salt-piercement structure formed by the movement of late Neoproterozoic to Early Cambrian Hormuz Formation salt. The salt has moved progressively upward, puncturing through the younger overlying strata to create a salt dome structure. Surface expressions are composed of evaporites rocks, plus igneous rocks and quartzitic sandstone.

The island, an environmentally protected area under the Sharjah Environment and Protected Areas Authority (EPAA), has been registered on the list of wetlands of international importance under the Ramsar Convention, and was in 2012 listed as a potential UNESCO World Heritage Site.

Economy 
Sharjah has a small harbour and an airfield , both located at the island's southeast end.

Crescent Petroleum is the concession holder of the area. The acreage is flanked to the north-northeast by Dubai's Fateh Oil Field complex, to the north by the Sirri Island oil field of Iran, and to the west by the prolific oil and gas fields of Abu Dhabi.

See also 
 Zirku Island
 Al Marmoom Desert Conservation Reserve, Dubai
 Al-Wathba Wetland Reserve, Abu Dhabi
 Dubai Desert Conservation Reserve
 Jebel Hafeet National Park, Abu Dhabi
 Mangrove National Park, Abu Dhabi
 Ras Al Khor, Dubai
 Sir Bani Yas, Abu Dhabi
 Wadi Wurayah, Fujairah
 Wildlife of the United Arab Emirates

References 

Geography of the Emirate of Sharjah
Islands of the United Arab Emirates
Ramsar sites in the United Arab Emirates
Islands of the Persian Gulf